Karl Eduard Nobiling (10 April 1848 – 10 September 1878) was a German attempted assassin, who in 1878 made an attempt on the life of Emperor Wilhelm I.

Nobiling was born in Kolno near Birnbaum (Międzychód) in the Prussian Province of Posen, where his father was the tenant of the local manor. He attended school in Züllichau (Sulechów) and studied political science and agriculture at the University of Halle and Leipzig University, where he received a doctor's degree in 1876. During his studenthood he may have had some minor contact with Socialist circles, though an affiliation with the contemporary Social democratic movement has not been conclusively established.

Nobiling moved to Berlin and in the afternoon of 2 June 1878, he shot and wounded Kaiser Wilhelm I from the window of his apartment on the Unter den Linden boulevard. He used a double-barrelled shotgun and numerous grains hit the body of the emperor, though the life of the 81-year-old was saved by his Pickelhaube helmet. When immediately after the failed assassination attempt several witnesses tried to disarm him, Nobiling shot himself in the head with a revolver. Not fit to be questioned, he soon fell senseless and finally succumbed to his injuries in September 1878. His attempt to murder Wilhelm came less than one month after a similar attempt by Max Hödel.

Chancellor Otto von Bismarck used the actions of Nobiling and Hödel as justification to implement the Anti-Socialist Law in October 1878.

Literature 
 Vizetelly, Ernest A.: The Anarchists: Their Faith and Their Record. Edinburgh 1911 (ausführliche Beschreibung des Tathergangs in Kapitel 3).
 Kellerhoff, Sven Felix: Attentäter. Wahnsinnige, Verführte, Kriminelle. Arean, Erftstadt 2005 , S. 31 ff.
 Mühlnikel, Marcus: Fürst, sind Sie unverletzt?' Attentate im Kaiserreich 1871–1914. Schöningh, Paderborn 2014 

1848 births
1878 deaths
1878 crimes in Europe
German assassins
People from the Rhine Province
Suicides by firearm in Germany
Failed regicides
Martin Luther University of Halle-Wittenberg alumni
Leipzig University alumni
German anarchists
Executed anarchists